Football Club Uzhhorod is a Ukrainian professional football club from Uzhhorod previously competing in the regional competitions of Zakarpattia Oblast and Ukrainian amateur competitions.

History
The club was founded in 2015. It is the third attempt to create a city football team in post Soviet Ukraine in Uzhhorod. The first time it was made in 1995 by Mykola Sydor, but the team only existed for a single season. In 2011, the second team actively existed for couple of season on initiative of the president of the Uzhhorod city football federation Viktor Kachur.

Honours
Football championship of Zakarpattia Oblast
 Winners (2): 2015, 2016

Football cup of Zakarpattia Oblast
 Winners (2): 2015, 2016

Players

League and cup history

{|class="wikitable"
|-bgcolor="#efefef"
! Season
! Div.
! Pos.
! Pl.
! W
! D
! L
! GS
! GA
! P
!Domestic Cup
!colspan=2|Other
!Notes
|-
| align="center" |2018–19
| align="center" |4th "A"
| align="center" |6/10
| align="center" |18
| align="center" |6
| align="center" |2
| align="center" |10
| align="center" |26
| align="center" |37
| align="center" |20
| align="center" |
| align="center" |
| align="center" |
| align="center" bgcolor=lightgreen|Admitted
|-bgcolor=PowderBlue
| align="center" |2019–20
| align="center" |3rd "A"
| align="center" |10/11
| align="center" |20
| align="center" |5
| align="center" |4
| align="center" |11
| align="center" |19
| align="center" |36
| align="center" |19
| align="center" | finals
| align="center" |
| align="center" |
| align="center" |
|-bgcolor=PowderBlue
| align="center" |2020–21
| align="center" |3rd "A"
| align="center" |2/13
| align="center" |24
| align="center" |17
| align="center" |4
| align="center" |3
| align="center" |50
| align="center" |23
| align="center" |55
| align="center" | finals
| align="center" |
| align="center" |
| align="center" bgcolor=lightgreen|Promoted
|}

Coaches
 2015 Mykhaylo Ivanytsia
 2016 Ivan Shanta
 2017 – 2018 Taras Tulaydan
 2018 Myroslav Babiak
 2019 Vasyl Varha
 2020 Mykhaylo Ivanytsia
 2020 – 2021 Volodymyr Vasyutyk
 2021 Mykhaylo Ivanytsia
 2021 – present Bohdan Blavatskyi (caretaker)

See also
 FC Hoverla Uzhhorod

References

External links
 
 FC Uzhhorod. Football Federation of Zakarpattia.

 
Ukrainian First League clubs
Football clubs in Zakarpattia Oblast
Sport in Uzhhorod
Association football clubs established in 2015
2015 establishments in Ukraine